Cynarina is a genus of stony corals in the family Lobophylliidae.

Species
The World Register of Marine Species currently lists the following species:
 Cynarina lacrymalis (Milne Edwards & Haime, 1848)
 Cynarina macassarensis (Best & Hoeksema, 1987)

References

Lobophylliidae
Scleractinia genera